The United States ambassador to Vietnam (Vietnamese: Đại sứ Hoa Kỳ tại Việt Nam) is the chief American diplomat to the Socialist Republic of Vietnam. After the First Indochina War and the defeat of the French domination over Vietnam, the country was split into North and South Vietnam at the Geneva Conference of 1954. The United States did not recognize North Vietnam and thus had no diplomatic relations with the country. After the reunification of Vietnam in 1976, there followed a period of 20 years in which the United States had no diplomatic relations with Vietnam.

The U.S. opened a Liaison Office in Hanoi on January 28, 1995. Diplomatic relations were established July 11, 1995, and the embassy in Hanoi was established with L. Desaix Anderson as chargé d’affaires ad interim.

Ambassadors

Residence

The house used by the U.S. ambassador was designed by M. LaCollogne, Principal Architect and Chief of Civil Construction Service in Tonkin and built in 1921 by Indochina Public Property, part of the French colonial government, for Indochina Financial Governors who lived here until 1948. The house was then assigned, until 1954, to the highest-ranking Indochina Tariff Officer. When the French left South East Asia in 1954, Vietnamese government officials moved in. Vice Minister Phan Kế Toại was the last occupant; at his death, the house became the headquarters for the Committee for Foreign Culture Exchange.  The Ministry of Foreign Affairs’ press office was located in the building until 1994. The residence was included in an exchange of property between the United States of America and the Socialist Republic of Vietnam in 1995.

Notes

See also
United States - Vietnam relations
Foreign relations of Vietnam
Ambassadors of the United States

References
United States Department of State: Background notes on Vietnam

External links
 United States Department of State: Chiefs of Mission for Vietnam
 United States Department of State: Vietnam
 United States Embassy in Hanoi

Vietnam
 
United States
Register of Culturally Significant Property